The Black Label Inc. (stylized as THEBLACKLABEL or THEBLΛƆKLΛBEL) is a South Korean record label and an associate company of YG Entertainment. It was founded in 2015 by YG producer Teddy and Kush.

History
On September 22, 2015, YG Entertainment announced the creation of the independent sub-label to be headed by YG producer Teddy and Kush. On March 17, 2016, Zion.T signed with the label. On May 3, 2017, Okasian signed an exclusive contract with the label. Danny Chung (formerly known as Decipher) has also signed with the label. The label is also home to Jeon Somi, who signed with the label in September 2018, and debuted on June 13, 2019. On November 16, 2020, as per the quarterly stock report of YG Entertainment, the label was converted to an associate company status. On December 26, 2022, the company announced Taeyang joined the label but remained a member of the group, Big Bang. In January 2023, actor Park Bo-gum signed with the label.

Artists

Soloists
 Jeon Somi
 Taeyang
 Vince
 Zion.T
 Løren

Actors/Models
 Park Bo-gum
 Lee Jun-young
 Heo Jae-hyuk
 Lee Joo-myung
 Ella Gross

Producers
 Teddy
 R.Tee
 Zion.T
 Peejay
 24 	
 Vince	
 Løren
 Dominsuk
 Danny Chung
 Bryan Cha$e (Hoyun)
 Okasian
 Jeon Somi
 ALV
 IDO
 Taeyang

Partnerships

Music distribution
The Black Label records are distributed by the following:
 YG Plus 
 Interscope Records

Discography

Notes

References 

 
South Korean companies established in 1996
Clothing brands of South Korea
Companies based in Seoul
Companies listed on KOSDAQ
Cosmetics brands of South Korea
Electronic dance music record labels
Hip hop record labels
Labels distributed by Warner Music Group
Labels distributed by CJ E&M Music and Live
Music publishing companies of South Korea
K-pop record labels
Publishing companies established in 1996
Record labels established in 1996
South Korean brands
South Korean record labels
Sports management companies
Synth-pop record labels
Talent agencies of South Korea